Cambor is a surname. Notable people with the surname include:

Kathleen Cambor, American author
Peter Cambor (born 1978), American actor, writer, and producer

See also
 Camber (disambiguation)
 Tambor (disambiguation)